Leg is a 1991 Soviet action film directed by Nikita Tyagunov.

Plot 
The film tells about a Moscow guy who, at the age of 19, participated in military operations in Afghanistan, where he lost his leg. Returning home, he began to realize that his problems had just begun.

Cast 
 Ivan Okhlobystin as Martyn (as Ivan Chuzhoy)
 Pyotr Mamonov as Martyn's brother
 Ivan Zakhava 
 Natalya Petrova as Kamilla
 Farkhad Makhmudov as Kamilla's Brother
 Lyudmila Larionova as Aunt Lyuda
 Sherali Abdulkajsov as Inspector
 Oksana Mysina as Anzhelika
 M. Ajnetdinova
 D. Andrianov

References

External links 
 

1991 films
1990s Russian-language films
Soviet action films
1991 action films